The Devil May Cry series has seen the release of seven separate soundtracks. Initially, Capcom was very reluctant to release an officially sanctioned soundtrack for the Devil May Cry series, due to worries that the products would sell poorly. As a means of testing the market, Capcom decided to ask for pre-release sales.

After the pre-release sales were met, the Devil May Cry and Devil May Cry 2 soundtracks were released to the public on October 15, 2004. Both were released as separate 2-disc sets, with Masami Ueda, Misao Senbongi, and Masato Koda credited as producers for the Devil May Cry soundtrack and Masato Koda, Tetsuya Shibata and Satoshi Ise credited as producers for the Devil May Cry 2 soundtrack.

Original soundtrack

Devil May Cry

Track listing

Devil May Cry 2

Track listing

Devil May Cry 3

After the success of the Devil May Cry Original Soundtrack and Devil May Cry 2 Original Soundtrack, Capcom decided to release the Devil May Cry 3 Original Soundtrack on March 31, 2005, shortly after the release of Devil May Cry 3: Dante's Awakening, with Tetsuya Shibata and Kento Hasegawa credited as the producers. This was released as a 3-disc set.

The vocal songs from Devil May Cry 3 were written and the rough vocals performed by Shawn "Shootie HG" McPherson of heavy metal band Hostile Groove, with David Baker performing the more melodic vocals.

Track listing

Devil May Cry: The Animated series

Released on August 18, 2007, in Japan by Rungran, which is a collective for all the composers who wrote for the anime, Devil May Cry. The composers consist of Aimee B, Gabriele Roberto, Giacomo Puccini, Hiroaki Tsutsumi, JETBIKINI, Kenji Fujii, Rin Oikawa, Shigekazu Aida, Suble and Takeshi Hama.

Track listing

Devil May Cry 4

Devil May Cry 4 Original Soundtrack is a 3-disc, 104 track soundtrack to the video game Devil May Cry 4. It was released in Japan on February 27, 2008.
 Female vocals are handled by Aubrey Ashburn (1-02) while male vocals are handled by Shawn "Shootie HG" McPherson of Hostile Groove (1-20 and 3-03) and Jason "ShyBoy" Arnold of Hypnogaja (1-13 and 3-38). Tetsuya Shibata is credited as the primary composer, with tracks composed by Shusaku Uchiyama, Kota Suzuki, Akihiko Narita, Rei Kondoh, Chamy Ishikawa and Shinichiro Satoh. The soundtrack was released in the USA on 25 Nov 2008 with a new artwork.

Track listing

DmC: Devil May Cry

DmC: Devil May Cry Soundtrack Selection is the soundtrack to the game DmC: Devil May Cry. It was released on 15 January 2013, coinciding with the game's release date. The soundtrack selection is not available for commercial sale, it was instead a European bonus that came with pre-ordered Premium/Special editions.  The tracks are composed by Noisia and Andy LaPlegua and performed by Noisia (1-7) and Combichrist (8-15).

Both bands have released their own editions: No Redemption by Combichrist and DmC: Devil May Cry Soundtrack by Noisia.

Track listing

Special soundtrack

Devil May Cry: Dangerous hits

Track listing

Devil May Cry 4: Special

Released on December 19, 2007, in Japan, it comes with a CD with selected tracks from the game as well as a DVD with promotional videos. Female vocals are handled by Aubrey Ashburn ("Out of Darkness (Prologue)") while male vocals are handled by Shawn "Shootie HG" McPherson of Hostile Groove ("Sworn Through Swords" and "Lock and Load (Blackened Angel mix)") and Jason "ShyBoy" Arnold of Hypnogaja ("The Time Has Come" and "Shall Never Surrender (End Roll)").

Track listing

References

Devil May Cry